As part of the celebrations for the 2012 Summer Olympics in London, the BBC produced the film Bert and Dickie (also called Going For Gold: The '48 Games), depicting Dickie Burnell and Bert Bushnell's achievement at the 1948 Games.

Plot
Thrown together just five weeks before the final of the 1948 London Olympics, Bert Bushnell and Dickie Burnell row to victory in the double sculls.

Cast
 Sam Hoare as Dickie Burnell
 Matt Smith as Bert Bushnell
 Geoffrey Palmer as Charles Burnell
 James Frain as Jack Beresford
 Douglas Hodge as John Bushnell
 Anastasia Hille as Lena Bushnell
 Alexandra Moen as Rosalind Burnell

Reception
Paddy Shennan of the Liverpool Echo said Bert and Dickie is thoroughly absorbing and uplifting and a winning drama about a winning team.  James Watson of The Telegraph highlighted the performances of Douglas Hodge and Geoffrey Palmer: Douglas Hodge brilliantly conveyed John Bushnell’s almost embarrassed desperation for Bert to succeed where he’d failed. Playing Charles Burnell, Geoffrey Palmer was, as ever, hard to beat for lugubrious gruffness. and concluded his review with anybody whose eyes didn’t join Bushnell Snr’s in filling with tears is stronger than me.

Awards and nominations
The following is a table listing the awards and nominations received by Bert and Dickie:

References

External links 

BBC page for Bert and Dickie

1948 Summer Olympics
British biographical dictionaries
2012 biographical drama films
2012 films
British sports drama films
Films set in 1948
Films set in England
Films about the 1948 Summer Olympics
Sports films based on actual events
2010s sports drama films
2012 television films
Films directed by David Blair (director)
2010s English-language films
2010s British films
British drama television films